Song of Stockholm (Swedish: Sången om Stockholm) is a 1947 Swedish musical drama film directed by Elof Ahrle and starring Ahrle, Alice Babs and Bengt Logardt. The film's sets were designed by the art director Arthur Spjuth.

Cast
 Elof Ahrle as Knatten
 Alice Babs as Britt
 Bengt Logardt as 	Jan
 Åke Grönberg as Åke
 Marianne Gyllenhammar as Anne-Marie
 Anders Börje as Anders
 Hilda Borgström as 	Jans mor
 Douglas Håge as 	Britts far
 Carin Swensson as Gullan
 Nils Ferlin as Nils
 Sune Waldimir as 	Sune
 Eric Gustafson as 	Direktör Rosenstam
 Gustaf Lövås as 	Rakbladsförsäljaren

References

Bibliography 
 Qvist, Per Olov & von Bagh, Peter. Guide to the Cinema of Sweden and Finland. Greenwood Publishing Group, 2000.

External links 
 

1947 films
Swedish drama films
1947 drama films
1940s Swedish-language films
Films directed by Elof Ahrle
Swedish black-and-white films
1940s Swedish films